Margaret Milne McConnachie Farquharson (17 August 1884 – after 1936) was a Scottish suffragette, MP candidate and leader of the National Political League campaigning for Palestine.

Life 
Farquharson was born in 1884. In 1908 she graduated with a master's degree from the University of Glasgow.

She came to notice before World War I as a leader in the women's suffrage movement. In 1909  she was arrested as a suffragette and jailed for five days in Holloway Prison. She was a salaried organiser for the Women's Freedom League in Liverpool with Mary Adelaide Broadhurst. However the WFL failed to establish a voice distinct from the WSPU. Money was requested for a full-time organiser in Liverpool, but the salaried posts in Liverpool were not supported after January 1909.

In 1911 the National Political League, NPL, was formed, led by its president Mary Adelaide Broadhurst. The league was an apolitical group supporting reform. Suffragette and funder Janie Allan, socialist Ethel Annakin Snowden, suffragette Laura Ainsworth, MP George Lansbury and John Scurr were amongst the league's supporters. She was the secretary and the NPL was based in St James Street in London. In 1913 they organised a meeting at Kingsway Hall where 1,500 people including George Bernard Shaw attended to discuss and protest the Force-feeding of hunger striking suffragettes. The meeting was reported word for word to the Home Office.

During the war the NPL created the National Land Council. This body created eleven locations in Britain where women could be trained to work on the land. The National Political League changed its name in 1917 to the National Political Reform League. In 1918 Farquharson was one of the first women to stand (unsuccessfully) to be a member of parliament.

By 1922 the NPL had aligned themselves with supporting the Palestinians and Arabs in general. It would appear that the NPL were supporting the Arab cause as they objected to the UK governments support for Zionism and they wanted to resist that and the rise of Bolshevikism. From March to May 1930 the British police kept her and the anti-semite fascist Robert Gordon Canning under observation to monitor their interactions with a delegation sent to London by the executive committee of the Palestine Arab Congress (ECPAC).

The NPL was funded by leading Muslims and UK government cabinet members were advised to avoid it. The league were trying to undermine or overturn the Balfour Declaration. Broadhurst died in 1928. From 1929 the NPL continued its work and it was in touch with the Muslim–Christian Alliance of Palestine.

A 1937 report intelligence report noted that "Miss Margaret Milne Farquharson [was] obtaining money from affluent Indians and Arabs". She was using this money to support the Pan-Islamists and the point of view of the Palestinians.

References 

Scottish suffragettes
Palestinian nationalism
1884 births
Year of death missing
Alumni of the University of Glasgow